Cavillatrix is a genus of flies in the family Tachinidae.

Species
 Cavillatrix luteipes Shima & Chao, 1992

References

Tachinidae